Viktor Sergeyevich Savelyev (24 February 1928 – 25 December 2013) was a Soviet and Russian surgeon. He was a full member of the Russian Academy of Sciences, from 1997 until his death, and of the Russian Academy of Medical Sciences. He was also a member of the Presidium of the Academy of Medical Sciences and Head of the Department of Surgery of the Russian State Medical University. He died on 25 December 2013 in Moscow, Russia at the age of 85.

Partial accolades
  Order of the Red Banner of Labour (1973)
  USSR State Prize (1975)
  Order of Lenin (1978)
  Hero of Socialist Labour (1988)
  State Prize of the Russian Federation (1993)
 Order For Merit to the Fatherland
 4th Class (1996)
 3rd Class (2003)
 2nd Class (2007)
 Demidov Prize (2002)

References

External links
Viktor Savelyev bio at warheroes.ru (English tab)

1928 births
2013 deaths
Russian surgeons
Soviet surgeons
Full Members of the Russian Academy of Sciences
Academicians of the USSR Academy of Medical Sciences
Academicians of the Russian Academy of Medical Sciences
Recipients of the USSR State Prize
Heroes of Socialist Labour
Recipients of the Order of Lenin
Recipients of the Order "For Merit to the Fatherland", 2nd class
Recipients of the Order "For Merit to the Fatherland", 3rd class
20th-century surgeons